Gokul Global University  (GGU) is a private university located in Sidhpur, Patan district, Gujarat, India. It was established on 23 March 2018 by the Gokul Foundation under Gujarat Private Universities (Amendment) Act, 2018, after the Bill was approved by the Gujarat Legislative Assembly in February 2018.

Constitute institutions
The university includes the following constituent institutes:
 Faculty of Engineering
 Faculty of Ayurveda
 Faculty of Paramedical 
 Faculty of Nursing 
 Faculty of Law 
 Faculty of Science
 Faculty of Commerce and Management
 Faculty of Arts, Humanities & Social Science
 Faculty of Computer Science & Applications

References

External links

Universities in Gujarat
Patan district
Educational institutions established in 2018
2018 establishments in Gujarat
Private universities in India